Cantoira is a comune (municipality) in the Metropolitan City of Turin in the Italian region Piedmont, located about  northwest of Turin.

Cantoira borders the following municipalities: Locana, Chialamberto, Monastero di Lanzo, and Ceres. The mountain-top Sanctuary of Santa Cristina is present here.

References

Cities and towns in Piedmont